The September 2020 Afghanistan attacks were multiple attacks that occurred in September 2020. The attacks left at least 105 people dead and another 112 injured. 97 insurgents were also killed and another 58 were injured in these attacks.

Timeline of attacks

See also
 List of mass car bombings
 May 2020 Afghanistan attacks
 June 2020 Afghanistan attacks
 July 2020 Afghanistan attacks
 August 2020 Afghanistan attacks

References

2020 in Kabul
2020 mass shootings in Asia
September 2020 attacks
2020s crimes in Kabul
21st century in Badakhshan Province
21st century in Badghis Province
21st century in Balkh Province
21st century in Herat Province
21st century in Kandahar Province
21st century in Kapisa Province
21st century in Khost Province
21st century in Nangarhar Province
21st century in Paktia Province
21st century in Urozgan Province
September 2020 attacks
Car and truck bombings in Afghanistan
Crime in Herat Province
Crime in Kandahar Province
Crime in Khost Province
Crime in Nangarhar Province
Daykundi Province
History of Faryab Province
History of Kabul Province
History of Takhar Province
Improvised explosive device bombings in 2020
Mass murder in 2020
Mass murder in Kabul
September 2020 crimes in Asia
September 2020 events in Afghanistan
Taliban bombings
Taliban bombings in Kabul